Matthew James Gill (born 8 November 1980) is an English professional football coach and former player, who is an assistant coach at Swansea City. He began his career in 1997, notably representing Peterborough United, Exeter City and Bristol Rovers.

Following his retirement in 2014, he moved into coaching, first becoming assistant manager at Tranmere Rovers before taking a post at the Norwich City academy. He left Norwich in October 2018, joining local rivals Ipswich Town as first-team coach to new manager Paul Lambert. Following Lambert's departure in February 2021, Gill was appointed as caretaker manager before Lambert's successor, Paul Cook, was appointed. Gill left the club in May 2021. He briefly joined Russell Martin at Milton Keynes Dons, before the pair moved to Swansea City in August 2021.

Playing career

Peterborough United
Born in Chatham, Kent, Gill began his career as a trainee with Third Division side Peterborough United. On 25 April 1998, during the 1997–98 season, Gill broke through into Peterborough's first team during a 3–1 loss to Torquay United. In over seven years at Peterborough, Gill made 149 first team appearances, scoring five goals.

Notts County
On 3 May 2004, Gill moved to League Two side Notts County for the 2004–05 season. After a tough start at Meadow Lane, Gill was placed on the transfer list by struggling manager Gary Mills. In November 2004 Mills was replaced by Ian Richardson who immediately removed him from the list. Gill went on to make 57 appearances for the Magpies before being transferred to Conference National side Exeter City on 16 January 2006 during the 2005–06 season, on a free transfer.

Exeter City
Since joining Exeter in 2006, Gill has quickly established himself as a first-team regular. He was sent off in the 2007 Conference National playoff final for a headbutt, becoming the first player to receive the red card at the new Wembley Stadium.

In September 2008, he was voted League Two player of the month, after scoring four goals in four games.

Norwich City
Gill agreed to sign for Norwich City on 9 June 2009 on a free transfer, which came into effect on 1 July. He made his debut in the opening day 7–1 defeat to Colchester United at Carrow Road. Injury blighted Gill's first season at Carrow Road, and he only managed 10 appearances in all competitions. Gill particularly impressed in the 3–0 win over Bristol Rovers on 1 May 2010. He continued his role of a substitute during the 2010–2011 Championship season, making some appearances off the bench, showcasing his long throw-ins to the fans.
Gill was released by Norwich City on 1 June 2011.

Gill returned to his first club Peterborough United on 23 September 2010 on a one-month loan deal and made his second debut for the Posh at home to MK Dons.

Bristol Rovers
Bristol Rovers agreed terms with Gill on 6 July 2011. Rovers faced competition for his signature, from clubs including Walsall and Exeter City, both of whom are League One clubs. On 1 August 2011 it was announced that Gill would be the club captain for Bristol Rovers for the 2011/12 season.

Gill returned to his former club Exeter City on 18 October 2013 on loan until the end of the year.

Tranmere Rovers
Gill signed for League Two outfit Tranmere Rovers on 29 May 2014 on a one-year contract. He signed as a player coach as Tranmere's second signing by new manager, Rob Edwards.

Coaching career

Tranmere Rovers
On 8 September 2014, he was named as Assistant Manager, following three months working with the manager at the club.
After Edwards was replaced by Micky Adams, Gill left Tranmere by mutual consent on 3 November 2014.

Norwich City
Gill returned to Norwich in 2015 to work in the Academy as a coach. He took on the interim role of Norwich's Under-23 manager for the remainder of the 2016/17 season following the exit of Dmitri Halajko, who left to become head of technical coaching at Leicester City's academy in February. Gill's role was confirmed as being permanent on 4 July 2017.

Ipswich Town 
On 27 October 2018, Gill left his role at Norwich to join local rivals Ipswich Town as first team coach as part of Paul Lambert's new backroom staff. Following Lambert's departure by mutual consent in February 2021, Gill was appointed as caretaker manager with fellow club coach Bryan Klug as his assistant. Gill oversaw one game while in caretaker charge, a 2–1 away win at Accrington Stanley, before new boss Paul Cook was appointed. It was confirmed that Gill would remain as a first team coach under Cook, alongside fellow coach Gary Roberts. However, on 7 May 2021, Gill left the club after Cook outlined his intentions of appointing a new backroom ahead of forthcoming season.

MK Dons  
Gill joined up with Russell Martin at Milton Keynes Dons on 29 June 2021. He was handed the role of technical development coach at Stadium MK.

Swansea City
Russell Martin and his MK coaching staff, including Gill, left to join Swansea City in August 2021 with Gill serving as technical development coach. He held this role until February 2022, where following the departure of Luke Williams, Gill became the interim assistant head coach at the swans. During pre season preparations ahead of the 2022-2023 season, Gill was promoted to assistant head coach permanently.

Career statistics

Managerial statistics

Honours
Peterborough United
Football League Third Division play-off: 1999–00

Exeter City
Conference Premier play-off: 2007–08

Norwich City
Football League One: 2009–10

Individual
Football League Two Player of the Month: September 2008

References

External links

1980 births
Living people
Sportspeople from Cambridge
Footballers from Kent
English footballers
Association football midfielders
Peterborough United F.C. players
Notts County F.C. players
Exeter City F.C. players
Norwich City F.C. players
Walsall F.C. players
Bristol Rovers F.C. players
Tranmere Rovers F.C. players
Tranmere Rovers F.C. non-playing staff
Norwich City F.C. non-playing staff
Ipswich Town F.C. non-playing staff
Swansea City A.F.C. non-playing staff
English Football League players
National League (English football) players